Fidelity Asian Values is a British investment trust focussed on investment in Asian stock markets (excluding Japan). The company is listed on the London Stock Exchange and forms part of the FTSE All Share Index. Its chairwoman is Kate Bolsover and is managed by Nitin Bajaj of Fidelity International.

References

External links
 Stockopedia - Fidelity Asian Values
 London Stock Exchange - Fidelity Asian (FAS)
 Google Finance - Fidelity Asian Values PLC(LON:FAS)
  Official site
 Fidelity Asian Values
 FAS Fund Overview
 FAS Annual Report

Investment trusts of the United Kingdom